US Post Office-Clyde is a historic post office building located at Clyde in Wayne County, New York.  It was designed and built in 1940–1941 and is one of a number of post offices in New York State designed by the Office of the Supervising Architect of the Treasury Department, Louis A. Simon. It is a -story steel-framed, brick building on a raised foundation with a limestone watercourse, in the Colonial Revival style. The interior features a mural by artist Thomas Donnelly executed in 1941 and titled Apple Pickers.

It was listed on the National Register of Historic Places in 1988.

References

Clyde
Colonial Revival architecture in New York (state)
Government buildings completed in 1941
Buildings and structures in Wayne County, New York
National Register of Historic Places in Wayne County, New York